Milan Doleček (born 30 November 1957) is a Czech rower and rowing coach. Doleček competed at the 1980 and 1988 Summer Olympics. He became a rowing coach after he retired from international competitions and has trained his son, Milan Doleček, and Ondřej Synek.

References

1957 births
Living people
Czech male rowers
Olympic rowers of Czechoslovakia
Rowers at the 1980 Summer Olympics
Rowers at the 1988 Summer Olympics
Rowers from Prague